Prads-Haute-Bléone (Prats Auta Blèuna in Vivaro-Alpine) is a commune in the Alpes-de-Haute-Provence department and in the Provence-Alpes-Côte d'Azur region in southeastern France.

The people of Prads-Haute-Bléone are called Pradins.

Geography
The neighboring communes of Prads-Haute-Bléone are Méolans-Revel, Allos, Villars-Colmars, Thorame-Basse, Draix, La Javie, Beaujeu and Verdaches.

The village lies on the right bank of the Bléone, which has its source in the northeastern part of the commune and flows southwest through the middle of the commune.

It is composed of nine hamlets ranging in elevation from 800 to 1,450 metres. This is also the highest summit of the Provence Alps and Prealps.

Geology
During the two last major glaciations, Riss glaciation and Würm glaciation, major glaciers occupied the valleys of the commune. A first glacier, reduced, occupied the top of the Valley of the Galebre (formerly commune of Mariaud). A great glacier flowed into the Bléone Valley; It received tributaries from the glacier valleys of the ravine of Bussing, Riou and the ravine of Jet des Eaux and Riou de l’Aune. The Riss glacier descended to Blegiers; the Würm glaciation was less thick and stopped below Heyre.

The valleys of the southern entrance to the town (Champourcin, Chanolles, Blegiers) are situated in limestone mountains of the Jurassic period. Further upstream and to left bank of the Bléone, the Carton and the Chau ridges are more recent limestone formations of the Upper Cretaceous. In front of these formations at the right bank, the Galabre ridge which separates the Bléone Valley is composed of Bathonian limestone. This has beds of marl, alternating with shallow (less than a meter) limestone and shale marl.

Relief

Tête de l'Estrop, 
Tête Noire
Le Caduc
Col de Talon

Hydrography
The commune is crossed by the Bléone and Galabre.

Environment
The commune has  of woods and forests, or 45% of its area.

Hamlets
Commune of Prads:
Prads
Tercier
Les Eaux Chaudes (an ancient camp in ruins)
La Favière
Former commune of Blégiers:
Blégiers
Champourcin
Chanolles
Chavailles
La Colle (uninhabited since 1982)
Les Combes
Heyre
Former commune of Mariaud:
L’Adrech (uninhabited since 1928)
L’Immérée (uninhabited since 1914)
Pré Fourcha (uninhabited since 1934)
Saume Longue
Vière (uninhabited since 1934, under restoration)

Transport

Natural and technological hazards

With respect to seismic activity, the area of Prads-Haute-Bléone is in zone 4 (medium risk) according to the probabilistic classification EC8 of 2011. The municipality of Prads-Haute-Bléone is also exposed to three other natural hazards:

Avalanche (only the Ministry recognises this risk, but not the prefecture)
Forest fire
Landslide: mudflows have occurred in the commune after heavy rainfall in July 2005

The municipality of Prads-Haute-Bléone is exposed to any of the risks of technological origin identified by the prefecture. The predictable natural  (PPR) of the municipality was approved in 1993 for the risk of land movement; the  does not exist. The commune was the subject to an avalanche, in 2009. In July 2005, the municipality also had significant mudslides after heavy rains. The following list includes earthquakes felt strongly in the town. They exceed a macro-seismic intensity level V on the MSK scale (sleepers awake, falling objects). The specified intensities are those felt in the town, the intensity can be stronger at the epicentre:

The earthquake of February 8, 1974, with an intensity level V and with Thorame-Haute and Basse at the epicentre,
The earthquake of October 31, 1997, with an intensity level VI and whose epicentre was located in the municipality of Prads-Haute-Bléone.

On 5 and 6 November 1968, Prads had one of the first landslides of magnitude which was studied in detail by geomorphologists. It was produced in the Ravin de la Frache (an Occitan term that precisely refers to a zone of talus), in l'Adret and located beneath the summit of Belle Valette.

In the autumn of 1967, already marked by heavy rains, the cracks in the ground expanded. During the winter of 1967-1968, the successions of freeze-thaw lubricated the sliding surfaces. The rainy spring only aggravated the instability of the land. During the autumn 1968 rains, more than a year after the start of the sequence, a flow was triggered resulting in a blackish marl-limestone detrital mass and marl-shale colluvium.

Toponymy
The name of the village, as it appears for the first time the 9th century (Colonia in Prato) is derived from the Latin pratum (pré). The plural is recent. The Bléone name means Wolf River.

Mariaud appears in the texts at the beginning of the 13th century, but in the form of Mariano: According to Ernest Nègre, the place name derived from the proper Roman name of Marianus, which has evolved from Mariaudo (1319), by attraction to the Provençal local maridado, meaning wedding. Other hypotheses exist.

Blegiers is mentioned for the first time in charters in the second decade of the 12th century, in the form de Bligerio, derived from the Germanic name Blidegar, possibly Latinized as Blidegarius.

Chanolles, cited in 1122 (Canola), comes from the Pre-Celtic oronym (mountain toponym) *Kan-.

The name of the locality of la Favière evokes a planted field of beans; that of Combes designates a ravine (similar to combe), downstream of the village of Prads.

Economy

In 2017, the active population amounted to 69 people, including 10 unemployed. These workers are in majority employees (68%), and are in majority employed outside the commune (52%).

At the end of 2015, the primary sector (agriculture, forestry, fishing) had 14 active institutions within the meaning of Insee (including non-professional operators and self-employment).

The number of professional farms, according to the Agreste survey of the Ministry of Agriculture, is nine in 2010. It was 11 in 2000, and 18 in 1988. Currently, these operators are divided into sheep and vegetable farmers.

At the end of 2015, the secondary sector (industry and construction) had 8 establishments, employing one worker. The hydroelectric power plant of Chanolles used the waters of the Bléone. The turbine had an output of 210kW.

Formerly, hydropower sawmills were installed in Champourcin, Blegiers and Prads. They all ceased operation in the 20th century. In 2013, a new artisanal sawmill was created in the village of Blegiers.

At the end of 2015, the tertiary sector (shops, transport, services) had eight institutions (one salaried employee), in addition to seven institutions in the administrative sector (together with the health and social sector and education), with six people employed.
According to the Observatoire départemental du tourisme, the tourist function is very important for the municipality, with more than five tourists accommodated per capita, despite a low capacity of accommodation for tourist purposes:

Several branded as furnished and a number non-furnished.
The only capacity for any collective accommodation is located in the shelters.

Secondary residences complement the capacity: with a number of 212, they represent 65% of dwellings.

The bistro at the Trois Évêchés, which carries the  brand, adheres to a charter which aims to "contribute to the conservation and the animation of the economic and social fabric in rural areas by maintaining a place in village life".

There is also a centre for excursions and hikes.

History
In ancient times, Bodiontiques (Bodiontici) lived in the Valley of the Bléone, and were therefore the Gallic people who lived in the valleys of the current commune of Prads-Haute-Bléone. The Bodiontiques, who were defeated by Augustus at the same time as other peoples present on the Trophy of the Alps (before 14 BC) are attached to the Roman province of Alpes Maritimae at its inception.

The communities of Blegiers, Champourcin, Chanolles, Chavailles, Mariaud and Prads were all of the Bailli of Digne.

Prads

The locality of Prads appears for the first time in charters in the High Middle Ages, as Prato, dependent upon the Abbey of Saint Victor in Marseille. It stood at the junction of the dioceses of Digne, Senez, and Embrun.

In 1298, it belongs to the Cluny Abbey, and then passes under the authority of the college Saint-Martial in Avignon. The abbey was eventually looted, ransacked and abandoned during the French Wars of Religion.

The tithes were levied by the Chapter of Digne.

In 1843, the priest of the parish, Paul Charpenel, writes the annals of the parish of Prads, not published to date. One of the municipal measures from this period is the construction of a public fountain in the village, under the Second Republic, in 1850.

The coup d'état of 2 December 1851 by Louis-Napoléon Bonaparte against the Second Republic caused an armed uprising in the Basses-Alpes, in defense of the constitution. After the failure of the uprising, severe repression descended on those who stood up to defend the Republic, which included an inhabitant of Prads.

As with many municipalities of the department, Prads acquired schools well before the Jules Ferry laws: in 1863, it had three, located in Prads, la Favière and Tercier. These schools provided a primary education to boys. While the Falloux Laws of 1851, required the opening of a girls school in communes with more than 800 inhabitants, Prads maintained a girls school in the 1860s, but that school closed before the end of the Second Empire. It is only since the Ferry Laws that Prads girls have attended school regularly.

Blégiers
In the Middle Ages, during the 12th century, the village of Blégiers (Bligerium) moved to the Roche-de-Blégiers, on a hilltop site. The community had a consulate in the 13th century. Its population increased from 81 feus in 1315, with another 14 in 1471. From that date, it was the Bishop who appointed the responsible chaplain of the souls of this parish, and who collects revenues attached to this church.

The two communities of Chanolles and Champourcin which had eight feus each count of 1315, were heavily depopulated by the crises of the 14th century (the Black Death and the Hundred Years' War), and were annexed by Blegiers in the 15th century. Champourcin and Chanolles churches were of the chapter of Digne.

The Lord of Chanolles, Louis le Roux, supported the Duke of Anjou as early as April 1382, this support was conditional on the participation of the Duke in the relief expedition to the Queen. The Lord of Blegiers, Louis Aymes, appears in the lists of support to the Angevins in 1385, after the death of Louis I.

In 1765, Blégiers had 257 inhabitants. The lordship of the place had belonged successively to the Grimaldi (14th century), Puget and Eissautier families.

As Prads, Blégiers acquired schools well before the Jules Ferry laws: In 1863, it had four installed in Blégiers and the villages of Heyres, Chanolles and Chavailles. These schools provided a primary education to boys. No instruction was given to girls, nor under the Falloux Laws of 1851, which required the opening of a girls school in the communes with more than 800 inhabitants, nor did the first Duruy Law (1867), which lowered the threshold to 500 inhabitants, concern Blegiers. The commune took advantage of subsidies from the second Duruy Law (1877) to build new schools everywhere. Only the Blegiers school was renovated. It is only with the Ferry Laws that girls became educated regularly.

While the settlement was isolated, polyculture allowed most of the needs to be met. Wine was produced locally, but had a poor reputation. A polyculture, the highest in the Bléone Valley, was abandoned before World War I. The decline of self-sufficient polyculture continued after World War II, and harvesting wheat was stopped in 1958.

Mariaud
The community of Mariaud appears in texts in 1218 (Mariaudum). With a consul from 1237, it had 50 feus in 1315, but only 10 by 1471.

In the conflict between Charles, Duke of Durazzo and Louis I, Duke of Anjou in the succession of Jeanne I, the Lord of Mariaud, Gui de Saint-Marcial, supported Louis as the Duke of Anjou from the spring of 1382.

It had 195 inhabitants in 1765.

As Prads and Blégiers, Mariaud acquired a school well before the Jules Ferry laws, for the hamlet of Vière. Also as with Blégiers and Prads, no instruction was given to girls by the Falloux Laws of 1851, and nor did the first Duruy Laws of 1867 apply to Mariaud. Again, it was with the Ferry Laws that Mariaud girls became educated regularly.

In 1939, after displacement of the village, the main settlement became Vière at Saume Longue.

French Revolution
During the French Revolution, the communes of Blegiers and Prads each had a patriotic society, both created after the end of 1792.

Contemporary period

On 30 July 1944, the hamlet of Eaux-Chaudes was burned by the Wehrmacht. From 1954 to 1959 the Foreign Legion set up a camp at a place called Les Eaux-Chaudes, which hosted 30 legionaries. This camp is now in ruins.

That of  joined them in 1977, and the commune was renamed Prads-Haute-Bléone.

On 24 March 2015, Germanwings Flight 9525, an Airbus A320 flying from Barcelona to Düsseldorf, crashed in the mountains within the territory of the commune, killing all 150 passengers and crew.

Heraldry

Politics and administration

The premises of the school of Blegiers contains the municipal library.

Demography

Prads and Prads-Haute-Bléone

In 2012, Prads-Haute-Bléone had 186 inhabitants. From the 21st century, places with less than a population of 10,000 have had a census every five years (2007, 2012, 2017, etc. for Prads-Haute-Bléone). Since 2004, the other figures are estimates.

The municipality had 180 inhabitants in 1990 against 980 for the three communes of Blegiers, Mariaud and Prads in 1881. All of the three communes experienced a population peak in the 1830s with 1294 inhabitants in 1836.

The table and chart that follow relate to the population of the municipality of Prads until 1968, then the new municipality of Prads (with Mariaud) in 1975, and finally Prads-Haute-Bléone (with Blegiers) from 1982.

In the 19th century, after a period of growth, Prads showed a 'slack' period where the population remained relatively stable at a level high. This period lasted from 1811 to 1851. The  then caused a movement of long-term demographic decline. By 1921, the municipality records the loss of more than half of its population over the historic high of 1836. The downward movement stops definitively than in the 1960s. Since then, the population has resumed some growth.

Blégiers demographics
For the enumeration of 1315, Blegiers, Chanolles, and Champourcin populations were added together.

The demographic history of Blegiers is marked by the loss of population during the 14th and 15th centuries due to the Black Death and the Hundred Years' War, crises which completely destroyed the communities of Chanolles and Champourcin and also touched that of Blegiers, strongly.

In the 19th century, after a period of growth, Blegiers had a 'slack' period where the population remained relatively stable at a level high. This period lasted from 1821 to 1851. The  then caused a faster long-term decline than in Prads. By 1906, the settlement had lost more than half of its population, since the historic maximum in 1836. The downward movement continued until the 1970s and the merger with Prads.

Mariaud demographics

Just like Blegiers, Mariaud is marked by a loss of population during the 14th and 15th centuries due to the Black Death and the Hundred Years' War, and lost 80% of its population between 1315 and 1471. However, the depopulation crisis had been over for several decades by 1471.

In the 19th century, after a period of growth, Mariaud shows a period of 'slack' for longer than its neighbours, from 1806 to 1866. Though, if the  began here later, it affected Mariaud, Blegiers and Prads with equal strength. In 1911, the town had lost more than half its population compared to the historical maximum of 1831. The downward movement continued until the 1960s and brought about the merger with Prads.

Sites and monuments

Natural places

The RD107 road offers beautiful panoramic views.

Churches and chapels
The Sainte-Anne Parish Church of Prads, which dates from the 14th century, was entirely rebuilt in 1876-1878, and repaired in 1888. The nave, long with three bays, leads into a chancel of false-style Gothic. It is oriented to the north-west.

The Abbey of Sainte-Marie-de-Villevieille, known as Faillefeu or Prads was built in the middle of the 12th century by the monks of Boscodon, which was then given to the Abbey of Cîteaux. The priory was then dependent on Cluny. The church has collapsed completely and is a pile of earth and stone, between the monastic buildings still standing.

The commune of Prads-Haute-Bléone gathers three old communes and six medieval communities, which explains the large number of religious buildings that are found in its territory:

The Chapel of Our Lady at Tercier, rebuilt by the inhabitants in 1829.
The Church of Our Lady at Blegiers, which was originally a small chapel is much extended around 1830 with the ancient Saint-Barbara's Chapel being converted into a sacristy. The bell tower was rebuilt in 1877.
The Heyres Saint-Roch Chapel, which was a branch of Our Lady at Blegiers, was restored in 1982.
The Church of Saint-Jean-Baptiste (rebuilt in 1810, restored in 1865) at Chanolles, with a statue of St. John from the 15th century, carved, painted wooden and classified. Its bell tower dates from the end of the 19th century.
The Church of Saint-Laurent at Chavailles (formerly Saint-Sauveur) was rebuilt in 1842 after being originally built in the 13th century. The bell tower dates from the Second Empire. In the church furniture, a silver ciborium dated from the 17th century (classified as a Monument historique object). Its small processional cross, silver, dates from the 18th century and is also classified.
The old Church of Our Lady of Beauvezer in Champourcin (the chalice and the paten of silver, from the 17th century, are classified).
At the village of Champourcin, Saint-Christophe's Church is installed in a basement, with a bell tower in the garden.

The Chapel of Our Lady of the Transfiguration, in the hamlet of la Favière, rebuilt in 1838. The Church was the seat of a parish in the 14th century, the presbytery dates from the beginning of the 1870s, the bell tower of the 1880s.
The ruins of the Church of Saint-Étienne of Vière (Romanesque, built in the 13th century with ongoing restoration since 2011), in the former village of Mariaud. The cobbles of the parvise of the Church of Saint-Étienne draws a Jerusalem cross inscribed in a Reuleaux triangle.

Castle
The Château de Mariaud is in a state of ruin.

Notable people
This is the village of  father, the writer frequently spends his summer vacation here.  was an 18th-century businessman who was born in Blégiers.

See also
Communes of the Alpes-de-Haute-Provence department

Books

This book, very well documented, traces the history of the ancient Abbey of Faillefeu and the exploitation of the homonymous forest. The author cites ancient families involved in the logging and transport of logs floated along the Bléone Valley.

This book is the transcription of the book by reason of a family of farmers, over 6 generations, living in the hamlet of Adret, within the former commune of Mariaud. It traces mainly baptisms and the accounts of the household, as well as important transactions received before a notary.

Bibliography

 (BnF no. FRBNF35450017h)

References

External links

Prads-Haute-Bléone on the website of the Institut géographique national
Prads-Haute-Bléone

Communes of Alpes-de-Haute-Provence